Darul Islam Islamic High School is a semi-private school based in Greenhaven, Athlone, Cape Town. The school was established in 1995, by the current Muslim Judicial Council president Sheikh Irafaan Abrahams.

References

1995 establishments in South Africa
Schools in Cape Town
Athlone, Cape Town